Nawalapitiya is a town in Kandy District, Sri Lanka. It is governed by an Urban Council. It is located on the banks of the Mahaweli Ganga. The area was developed during the colonisation of the island by the British, as one of the colony's centres of Coffee Production.

Transport

Nawalapitiya is located at the junction of Nawalapitya-Ginigathena (B319); Nawalypitia-Kotmale (B317) and Kandy Roads (AB13). 

In 1874 the railway line was extended from Kandy to Nawalapitiya, with the Nawalapitiya railway station opening on 21 December. The station serves as a terminus for a number of commuter trains, with all local trains stopping at the station. The station comprises three platforms and two siding loops. In 1885 the railway was extended to Nanu Oya.

References 

Populated places in Kandy District